The Discovery Bridge is a pair of truss bridges carrying Missouri Route 370 across the Missouri River between St. Louis County and St. Charles County, in the U.S. state of Missouri.

A barrier-separated bicycle and pedestrian path along the northeast side of the bridge opened in 2020. Separate bicycle/pedestrian access ramps are available immediately on both ends of the bridge.  This provides a connection to and from the Katy Trail, which passes under the bridge. 

Before the separated path opened, the shoulder on both sides was designated a bicycle and pedestrian path. The bicycle lane and shoulders were converted into an extra travel lane in each direction in November 2011 due to the rehabilitation of the westbound Blanchette (I-70) Bridge and the bridge was closed for bicycle and pedestrian use. The alternative river crossing was the Veterans Memorial (Page Ave) Bridge, adding about 15 miles' distance to trips involving a river crossing. The bicycle/pedestrian lanes reopened in May 2014.

See also
List of crossings of the Missouri River

References

Bridges in Greater St. Louis
Bridges in St. Louis County, Missouri
Bridges in St. Charles County, Missouri
Bridges completed in 1993
Road bridges in Missouri